Kacho Papad Pako Papad is a 2017 Indian streaming television series created for SonyLIV, the digital platform of Sony Pictures Networks India. It was directed by Chetan Sharma and written and produced by Hamsukh Gandhi under the banner of M2 Entertainment. It was the first Gujarati romantic comedy drama, released on SonyLIV on 19 May 2017. It starred Bhakti Rathod, Sagar Dariyai, Rupa Divatia, and Pratap Sachdeo in the main roles. The series chronicles the dilemmas of an average, middle class joint Gujarati family.

Plot 
Kacho Papad Pako Papad is centered on the life of the Maniyar family who over complicate all their daily problems. It all starts when their son Vipul (Sagar Dariyai) introduces the family to a girl (Bhakti Rathod) who is older than him. But, trouble mounts when the girl who is several years younger, expresses her love for their son and intends to marry him.

Music video 
In May 2017 SonyLIV announced a romantic music video titled Aadat Che Tu for this series. It was released on 5 June 2017. The lyrics were written by Bharat Kumar Joshi and composed by music director Sukumar Dutta.

Episodes

Season 1

References

External links 

 

Romantic comedy television series
Gujarati-language television shows
SonyLIV original films